C'mon C'mon is a 2021 American black-and-white drama film written and directed by Mike Mills. It stars Joaquin Phoenix, Gaby Hoffmann, Scoot McNairy, Molly Webster, Jaboukie Young-White, and Woody Norman. The film had its world premiere at the 48th Telluride Film Festival on September 2, 2021, and was released in limited theatres on November 19, 2021, by A24. It has received acclaim from critics, with praise for its performances, direction, and cinematography.

Plot 
Johnny is a radio journalist traveling the country with his producing partners, interviewing children about their lives and their thoughts on the future. While in Detroit he calls his sister Viv; they had not spoken for the past year since their mother's death from dementia. Viv asks Johnny if he can come to Los Angeles and watch her nine-year-old son Jesse, as she has to travel to Oakland to care for her estranged husband Paul struggling with mental illness. Johnny agrees, and he and Jesse quickly forge a bond.

Viv experiences difficulties dealing with Paul and has to stay longer than expected in Oakland, while Johnny is pressured by his partners to return to work. Johnny convinces Viv to let him take Jesse with him back to New York City. Jesse increasingly gets on Johnny's nerves, and Johnny eventually snaps at Jesse, scaring him; he later apologizes at Viv's urging. He shows Jesse how to operate his audio equipment and lets him come along to more interviews with children. Jesse continues to ask Johnny questions about his personal life and his relationship with Viv. It is revealed that Johnny and Viv fought over their mother's deathbed with differing opinions on how to care for her, and that Johnny was once in a long-term relationship with a woman, called Louisa, whom he still loves.

Jesse gets homesick and yearns to see his mother, while Johnny is increasingly pressured to return to the road and resume work. Johnny buys him a plane ticket back to LA, but en route Jesse requests to stop and use the bathroom, locking himself inside and refusing to leave until Johnny relents and lets him stay. Johnny takes Jesse to New Orleans as the crew continues to interview children. Jesse begins to ask questions about his father and what is wrong with him, and expresses fear that he will grow up to have the same problems himself. Johnny reassures Jesse that this will not happen, as Viv has taught him how to deal with his emotions in a healthier way.

Viv later calls and says that Paul has accepted treatment and is doing much better, and the doctors are letting him come home. Johnny shares the good news with Jesse, who suddenly runs away through a park in fear. Johnny catches up and tells him it is okay to say he is not happy; they scream together in frustration until Jesse begins laughing. Viv flies to New Orleans to pick up Jesse and take him back to Los Angeles; Johnny promises to stay in touch with both of them. Johnny later sends Jesse a voice recording recounting everything that happened on their trip, as Jesse had requested so that he does not forget the experience.

Cast
 Joaquin Phoenix as Johnny
 Gaby Hoffmann as Viv
 Woody Norman as Jesse
 Scoot McNairy as Paul
 Molly Webster as Roxanne
 Jaboukie Young-White as Fernando

Production
In September 2019, it was announced Joaquin Phoenix had been cast in the film, with Mike Mills directing from a screenplay he wrote, with A24 distributing. In October 2019, Gaby Hoffmann joined the cast of the film.

Principal photography began in November 2019 and ended in January 2020. The film was shot primarily in New Orleans, New York, Los Angeles and Detroit. In December 2019, cinematographer Robbie Ryan revealed that he was shooting the film. In February 2020, it was announced that Woody Norman had joined the cast of the film.

In the film, Joaquin Phoenix's character, Johnny, works as a radio journalist. Co-star Molly Webster, who plays Roxanne, is a real-life public radio journalist and Senior Correspondent for WNYC's Radiolab. The children who appear in interview scenes were not actors, and their authentic responses to Phoenix and others' questions were captured.

Release
C'mon C'mon had its world premiere at the Telluride Film Festival on September 2, 2021. The film screened at film festivals in Chicago, the Hamptons, Mill Valley, New York, Rome and San Diego among others. It received a limited release in US theaters on November 19, 2021.

Reception

Box office 
In its opening weekend, the film made $134,000 from five theaters; its per-venue average of $26,800 was the best for a limited release since February 2020. In its second weekend, the film made $293,800 in 102 theaters. In its third, the film expanded into 565 theaters and earned $462,022 at the box office.

Critical response 
On the review aggregator website Rotten Tomatoes, the film holds an approval rating of 94% on 202 reviews, with an average rating of 8.0/10. The website's critics consensus reads: "The sweet chemistry between Joaquin Phoenix and Woody Norman is complemented by writer-director Mike Mills' empathetic work, helping C'mon C'mon transcend its familiar trappings." On Metacritic, the film has a weighted average score of 82 out of 100, based on 43 critics, indicating "universal acclaim".

Accolades

Notes

References

External links
 
 Official screenplay

2021 films
2021 drama films
2021 independent films
American black-and-white films
American drama films
Films directed by Mike Mills
A24 (company) films
Films shot in New Orleans
Films shot in New York City
Films shot in Los Angeles
2020s English-language films
2020s American films